Kersten Thiele (born 29 September 1992) is a German professional racing cyclist. He rode at the 2015 UCI Track Cycling World Championships. He competed at the 2016 Summer Olympics as a member of the German men's team pursuit. The team finished in fifth place.

References

External links
 

1992 births
Living people
German male cyclists
Sportspeople from Göttingen
Olympic cyclists of Germany
Cyclists at the 2016 Summer Olympics
German track cyclists
Cyclists from Lower Saxony
21st-century German people